Service station may refer to:

 Filling station, a gasoline or petrol station 
 Automobile repair shop, a place where automobiles are repaired 
 Service centre or rest area, a public facility on motorways or controlled-access highways for resting or refuelling 
 Motorway service area, a rest area in the United Kingdom
 Service centre or truck stop